Andrew Julian Hiroaki Koji (born 10 November 1987) is a British actor and martial artist. He had his breakout role as Ah Sahm in the Cinemax series Warrior in 2019. Koji went on to play Storm Shadow in Snake Eyes (2021) and Yuichi "The Father" Kimura in Bullet Train (2022).

Life and career
Koji was born in 1987 in Epsom, Surrey, where he was raised. His father is Japanese and his mother is English.

Koji started in the industry doing extra work and making short films as a teenager. At 18 he moved to Thailand while still training in martial arts and did some small jobs in that film industry. He subsequently worked in Japan's film industry for a few years, before returning to England to train at the Actors' Temple Studio in London. Eventually, Koji started getting more jobs in theatre and TV in the UK. Regarding his opportunities there, he stated, "My dual heritage has not particularly been advantageous. Opportunities for East Asian actors at the time was and still is quite limited although things are changing."

Koji dropped out of university at the age of 19 to focus on acting and martial arts. In his twenties, Koji studied and competed in taekwondo and trained in Shaolin kung fu at the Shaolin Temple UK. He has written and produced his own films, and has also worked as a stunt double; most notably on Fast & Furious 6. He has also performed with the Royal Shakespeare Company, at the Regents Park Open Theatre, Hampstead Theatre, Royal Court, Charing Cross, and Ovalhouse among others.

By 2017, Koji was discouraged by a recent lack of television roles and considering a career change. His agent and his mother convinced him to submit an audition tape for the lead role of Ah Sahm in the Cinemax series Warrior, which he secured.

Based on an original idea by Bruce Lee for the 1972 series Kung Fu (1972 TV series), that starred David Carradine, and produced by filmmaker Justin Lin, Warrior is centered around a martial arts prodigy in the late 1870s who emigrates from China to America in search of his sister, only to be drawn into the Tong Wars of San Francisco.  In a nod to Lee's idea for the character’s ethnic background, Ah Sahm is of partial European ancestry, which Koji found fitting for the character, and relatable due to his own ancestry. The first season premiered in April 2019, and the second season premiered in October 2020.

Koji played Storm Shadow in the 2021 film Snake Eyes, and assassin Yuichi Kimura in David Leitch's 2022 action film Bullet Train. He will also appear in the action-fantasy film Boy Kills World helmed by Moritz Mohr.

Filmography

Film

Television

Theatre

References

External links

1987 births
21st-century British male actors
English male film actors
English male martial artists
English male taekwondo practitioners
English male television actors
English people of Japanese descent
English stunt performers
Living people
Male actors from Surrey
Male actors of Japanese descent
People from Epsom
British male actors of Japanese descent